Greenock is a ghost town in Bosque County, in the U.S. state of Texas.

History
A post office was established at Greenock on January 1, 1882, and remained in operation until June 6, 1916. A general store opened in 1892. The community had a population between 20 and 35 in the late 1800s but seemingly disappeared afterward.

Geography

Education
Greenock had its own school in the 1890s and remained in operation until 1916. There was also a separate school for black children. Today, Greenock is located within the Valley Mills Independent School District.

References

Ghost towns in Texas